In biochemistry, a glycolytic oscillation is the repetitive fluctuation of in the concentrations of metabolites, classically observed experimentally in yeast and muscle. The first observations of oscillatory behaviour in glycolysis were made by Duysens and Amesz in 1957.

The problem of modelling glycolytic oscillation has been studied in control theory and dynamical systems since the 1960s since the behaviour depends on the rate of substrate injection.
Early models used two variables, but the most complex behaviour they could demonstrate was period oscillations due to the Poincaré–Bendixson theorem, so later models introduced further variables.

References

Control theory